Zhang Hanyu (born 19 December 1964) is a Chinese actor.

Zhang became the first Chinese actor to win the "Grand Slam", winning Best Actor trophies from the Golden Horse Awards, Golden Rooster Awards, Hundred Flowers Awards and Huabiao Awards.

Life and career
Zhang was born in Beijing. He graduated from the city's Central Academy of Drama in 1988. He started his career by doing Mandarin voice dubbing for films such as Shark Tale, The Lord of the Rings trilogy, and Troy. Zhang subsequently played minor roles in some television series before appearing as supporting characters in films directed by Feng Xiaogang, such as Sorry Baby, Cell Phone, Big Shot's Funeral, and A World Without Thieves. He was called "Feng Xiaogang's imperial film extra (calefare)" (馮小剛御用龍套), and earned the appreciation of Feng.

In 2007, Zhang was cast as a lead character for the first time in the war drama film Assembly. Zhang's performance propelled him to fame and placed him among the ranks of first-class Chinese film stars. In 2008, Zhang also won the Best Actor Award at the 29th Hundred Flowers Awards and the Best Leading Actor Award at the Golden Horse Film Awards. The following year, Zhang won the Outstanding Actor Award at the Huabiao Awards.

Zhang also has supporting roles in various acclaimed films, such as Cao Baoping's crime drama The Equation of Love and Death; the espionage thriller The Message; and the action film Bodyguards and Assassins. Zhang also played Zhang Liang in the historical film White Vengeance.

In 2012, Zhang teamed up again with Feng Xiaogang in the disaster film Back to 1942, playing a priest.

In 2013, Zhang teamed up with actors Liu Ye and Huang Bo in the comedy film The Chef, the Actor, the Scoundrel directed by Guan Hu, where he played an opera actor.

In 2014, Zhang starred in Tsui Hark's wuxia film The Taking of Tiger Mountain. Playing an undercover PLA soldier, he won the Golden Rooster Awards for Best Actor. He next starred in the crime film Mr. Six directed by Guan Hu; and had a supporting role in Zhang Yimou's fantasy historical epic The Great Wall.

In 2016, Zhang headlined the crime thriller film Operation Mekong alongside Eddie Peng. The film received critical acclaim, and is the highest grossing Chinese cop film to date.

In 2017, Zhang starred in John Woo's police thriller film, Manhunt. He also starred in Wine War, the directorial debut of Leon Lai.

Filmography

Film

Television series

Awards and nominations

References

External links

 Zhang Hanyu's blog on Sina.com

|-
!colspan="3" style="background: #DAA520;" | Golden Horse Award
|-

 

1964 births
Living people
Male actors from Beijing
Central Academy of Drama alumni
Chinese male film actors
Chinese male television actors
20th-century Chinese male actors
21st-century Chinese male actors